ZYC may refer to:
 Cleopatra (group), also known as Cleopatra ZYC
 Estradiol 17β-benzoate, an estrogen ester also known as ZYC-30